Peter Gordon Milobar (born February 13, 1970) is a Canadian politician serving as an MLA (Member of the Legislative Assembly of British Columbia) from Kamloops. Milobar was elected in the 2017 provincial election as a member of the British Columbia Liberal Party caucus, representing the electoral district of the Kamloops-North Thompson. He is the Official Opposition Critic for Finance.

He was previously the 39th Mayor of Kamloops  for 3 terms from 2008 to 2017, making him Kamloops’ longest serving Mayor. Before that, Milobar served on Kamloops City Council for two terms from 2002 to 2008 and chaired the Thompson-Nicola Regional District from 2006 to 2011, making him the first Kamloops Mayor elected to Chair the Thompson Nicola Regional District. Following that, Milobar was then elected Chair of the Thompson Regional Hospital District  from 2012 to 2017.

Milobar was born in Edmonton, Alberta, and raised in Kamloops, British Columbia. While managing his family's Days Inn Hotel, Milobar made his first run for Kamloops City Council at the age of 32, winning his seat with 7,130 votes. Milobar ran on a platform of working to ensure Royal Inland Hospital (RIH) retain its status as a referral centre with further expansion/equipment to retain and attract new doctors and nurses, and the expansion of the local tax base by encouraging further development in Kamloops. At the age of 35 he was successfully re-elected as a city councillor in the 2005 municipal election. On July 30, 2008, Milobar announced his plans to run for Mayor in the 2008 fall election with a platform of "A Balanced Approach"  to decision making, and his goals of fulfilling tournament capital commitments, upgrading the sewage treatment plant, completing the Kamloops Sustainability Plan, working with agricultural groups on a new expo space, work on affordable housing options, safety initiatives between Royal Canadian Mounted Police and By-Law staff, and to work with BC Transit for continued sustainable transit expansion. Amid the Economic crisis of 2008, Kamloops elected the 38 year old Milobar as Mayor of Kamloops on November 15, 2008. 13,147 ballots cast in his favour, gave him 74.13% of the overall vote.

Electoral record

References

Living people
1970 births
21st-century Canadian politicians
Canadian people of Croatian descent
Alcohol distribution retailers
British Columbia Liberal Party MLAs
British Columbia municipal councillors
Canadian hoteliers
Mayors of Kamloops
Politicians from Edmonton